Pumdikot is a hill station near Pokhara in Kaski District of Gandaki Province in Nepal. The place has a viewpoint at an altitude of 1,500 meters above sea level, and has the second tallest statue of  Shiva in Nepal, after Kailashnath Mahadev Statue.

Shiva statue
Pumdikot has the tallest statue of Shiva in Nepal. The statue itself is 51 feet tall. It sits on a white stupa that adds 57 feet in height, making the entire structure 108 feet high. The statue is part of a larger plan that is currently underway, which will include construction of Martyr’s memorial park, a model of mount Sumeru featuring Shiva and Parvati and ensuring that the entire park is accessible to persons with disabilities. The park is projected to be about 50% done, with the Shiva statue being completed in late 2021. The statue premises also has 108 Shiva lingas that encircle the statue at its base. 

The construction of statue has promoted the places as a religious tourism destination. From the viewpoint, Pokhara Valley, Fewa Lake can be seen. The Himalayas and World Peace Pagoda can also be seen from the place.

Gallery

See also
List of Hindu temples in Nepal

References

Bazaars in Nepal
Hill stations in Nepal
Pokhara
Hindu temples in Nepal